Richard Grobham Howe may refer to:

 Sir Richard Grobham Howe, 2nd Baronet (1621–1703)
Sir Richard Grobham Howe, 3rd Baronet (c.1651–1730)